Nationalism and archaeology have been closely related since at least the nineteenth century. Nationalist ideologies frequently employ results of archaeology and ancient history as propaganda, often significantly distorting them to fit their aims, cultivating national mythologies and national mysticism. Frequently this involves the uncritical identification of one's own ethnic group with some ancient or even prehistoric (known only archaeologically) group, whether mainstream scholarship accepts as plausible or rejects as pseudoarchaeology the historical derivation of the contemporary group from the ancient one. The decisive point, often assumed implicitly, that it is possible to derive nationalist or ethnic pride from a population that lived millennia ago and, being known only archaeologically or epigraphically, is not remembered in living tradition.

Examples include Kurds claiming identity with the Medes, Albanians claiming as their origin the Illyrians, Iraqi propaganda invoking Sumer or Babylonia, Hindu nationalists and Tamils claiming as their origin the Indus Valley civilisation —all of the mentioned groups being known only from either ancient historiographers or archaeology. In extreme cases, nationalists will ignore the process of ethnogenesis altogether and claim ethnic identity of their own group with some scarcely attested ancient ethnicity known to scholarship by the chances of textual transmission or archaeological excavation.

See also 

Afrocentrism
Archaeology and racism
Albanian nationalism
Culture-historical archaeology
Facts on the Ground
Historical revisionism
Historical revisionism (negationism)
Irredentism
Nationalisms Across the Globe
National myth
Nationalist historiography
Nazi archaeology
Piltdown Man
Politics of archaeology in Israel and Palestine

References

Further reading

Nationalism in general 
 Díaz-Andreu, Margarita. A World History of Nineteenth-Century Archaeology. Nationalism, Colonialism and the Past. Oxford, Oxford University Press, 2007. 
 Díaz-Andreu, Margarita and Champion, Tim (eds.) Nationalism and Archaeology in Europe. London: UCL Press; Boulder, Co.: Westview Press, 1996.  (UCL Press);  (hb) & 978-0813330518 (pb) (Westview)
 Kohl, Philip L. "Nationalism and Archaeology: On the Constructions of Nations and the Reconstructions of the Remote past", Annual Review of Anthropology, 27, (1998): 223–246.
G. Fagan (ed.), Archaeological Fantasies: How Pseudoarchaeology Misrepresents the Past and Misleads the Public Routledge (2006), .
Kohl, Fawcett (eds.), Nationalism, Politics and the Practice of Archaeology, Cambridge University Press (1996), 
Bruce Lincoln, Theorizing Myth: Narrative, Ideology, and Scholarship, University of Chicago Press (2000), .

Specific nationalisms
Celtic
 Chapman, Malcolm. The Celts: The Construction of a Myth. New York: St. Martin's Press, 1992. 
 Dietler, Michael. "'Our Ancestors the Gauls': Archaeology, Ethnic Nationalism, and the Manipulation of Celtic Identity in Modern Europe". American Anthropologist, N.S. 96 (1994): 584–605.
 James, Simon. The Atlantic Celts: Ancient People or Modern Invention? London: British Museum Press, 1999. 
Israeli
 Abu El-Haj, Nadia. Facts on the Ground: Archaeological Practice and Territorial Self-Fashioning in Israeli Society. Chicago: University of Chicago Press, 2001. 
Spanish
 Díaz-Andreu, Margarita 2010. "Nationalism and Archaeology. Spanish Archaeology in the Europe of Nationalities". In Preucel, R. and Mrozowksi, S. (eds.), Contemporary Archaeology in Theory and Practice. London, Blackwell: 432–444.

Archaeology
Nationalism
Nationalism and archaeology